The 1959 Taça de Portugal Final was the final match of the 1958–59 Taça de Portugal, the 19th season of the Taça de Portugal, the premier Portuguese football cup competition organized by the Portuguese Football Federation (FPF). The match was played on 19 July 1959 at the Estádio Nacional in Oeiras, and opposed two Primeira Liga sides: Benfica and Porto. Benfica defeated Porto 1–0 to claim a tenth Taça de Portugal.

Match

Details

References

1958
Taca
S.L. Benfica matches
FC Porto matches